Following is a list of Kappa Alpha Order chapters and commissions in order of their charter date.  Chapter names were often reused in the early decades of the Fraternity, and the final successor group normally goes by the shortened name, for example Mu chapter at Tulsa is the fourth to carry that name.  "Commissions" first appeared in 1915, empowered to elect and initiate graduates of military institutions. They may be established for any chapter that was formerly active or for a four-year military institution, or in the case of Omega, used for both Centre graduates and for general legacy election. Where an active chapter is re-established, the commission at that school is deactivated. The active chapters are indicated in bold; inactive chapters are in italic.

Notes

References 

Lists of chapters of United States student societies by society
Kappa Alpha Order